This is a List of Economics Ministers of Germany from 1919 to the present.

Weimar Republic, 1919–1933

Nazi Germany, 1933–1945

Federal Republic of Germany, 1949-present (until 1990 West Germany)
Political Party:

East Germany (1949-1990)

|}

Economics